Route 64 is a three-mile (5 km) road that stretches from Nimitz Highway (Hawaii Route 92) to the entrance of Sand Island State Recreation Area just west of downtown Honolulu.  The route also goes by the street name as Sand Island Parkway.  The route gives access to Sand Island State Recreation Area and the U.S. Coast Guard Honolulu Branch by crossing the Kapalama Channel.

Route description
Route 64 begins on Sand Island, traveling northwest through the center of the island before crossing the Kapalama Channel. Once on mainland O'ahu, Route 64 continues northwesterly before a bend in the road, where the designation of the road changes from Sand Island Parkway to Sand Island Access Road and intersects the Nimitz Highway.

Major intersections

References

External links

Hawaiian Highways guide to Hawaii Route 64

0064
Transportation in Honolulu County, Hawaii
Transportation in Honolulu